Major Sir Hereward Wake, 14th Baronet, MC (7 October 1916 – 11 December 2017) was a British Army officer and countryman, he was educated at Sandroyd School and Eton College. Wounded in World War II while serving as a major in the King's Royal Rifle Corps, he served as Northamptonshire's High Sheriff in 1955 and Vice-Lieutenant from 1984 to 1991.

He married Julia Lees in 1952: the couple had three daughters and one son, Hereward, who succeeded his father as the 15th Baronet. The family lived at Courteenhall in Northamptonshire.

See also
 Wake baronets

References

External links 

1916 births
2017 deaths
King's Royal Rifle Corps officers
British Army personnel of World War II
Recipients of the Military Cross
People educated at Sandroyd School
Baronets in the Baronetage of England
Hereward
British centenarians
Men centenarians
High Sheriffs of Northamptonshire